Zhoutie Town (simplified Chinese 周铁镇 , traditional Chinese 周鐵鎮, pinyin zhōutiězhèn) is a town in Jiangsu, to the west of Lake Taihu, China.

Geography of Jiangsu